The Riviera Football League was an Australian rules football league in the East Gippsland region of Victoria, Australia.

History
The Riviera FL was created in 1986, when the second division of the East Gippsland Football League broke away to form its own league, joined by some clubs from the North Gippsland Football League.  The league disbanded after the 2003 season, with remaining teams moving to the North Gippsland FL, East Gippsland FL and Omeo District FL.

Clubs

2003 Ladder
																	

FINALS																	
 																	
																

Defunct Australian rules football competitions in Victoria (Australia)